The 1962 Open Championship was the 91st Open Championship, played from 11 to 13 July at Troon Golf Club in Troon, Scotland. Arnold Palmer won his second consecutive Open, six strokes ahead of runner-up Kel Nagle. It was the sixth of Palmer's seven major titles and the second of the year; he won his third Masters in April.

Qualifying took place on 9–10 July, and entries played 18 holes on the Old Course at Troon Golf Club and 18 holes on the Lochgreen Troon Municipal course. A maximum of 120 players qualified; the qualifying score was 154 and 119 players qualified. Eric Brown of Scotland led the qualifiers with 139, and Palmer was at 143. This was the last Open in which all players had to qualify; in 1963 a system of exemptions for the leading players was introduced. A maximum of 50 players could make the cut to play 36 holes on the final day.

Jack Nicklaus, the U.S. Open champion, competed in his first Open Championship.  Following an opening round 80, he rebounded with a 72 to make the cut and tied for 34th place.

The PGA Championship was played the next week (19–22 July) near Philadelphia, Pennsylvania, the first of five times in the 1960s that these two majors were played in consecutive weeks in July.

Past champions in the field

Made the cut

Missed the cut

Source:

Round summaries

First round
Wednesday, 11 July 1962

Source:

Second round
Thursday, 12 July 1962

A maximum of 50 players could make the cut, but 51 players scored 153 (+9) or better. The 12 players on 153 were therefore excluded and just the 39 who scored 152 (+8) or better qualified for the final day.

Source:

Amateurs: Green (+7), Cannon (+9), Carr (+9), Saddler (+9), Sinclair (+9), Stuart (+10), Blair (+11), Clark (+11), Edgar (+11),Shade (+11), Christmas (+12), Foster (+12), Walker (+13), MacCaskill (+17), Wilson (+18), Morrison (+19).

Third round
Friday, 13 July 1962 - (morning)

Final round
Friday, 13 July 1962 - (afternoon)
   
Amateurs: Green (+20)Source:

References

External links
Royal Troon 1962 (Official site)

The Open Championship
Golf tournaments in Scotland
Open Championship
Open Championship
Open Championship